Yuri Vladimirovich Kuleshov (born 12 April 1981) is a Russian professional football coach and a former defensive midfielder. He is an assistant coach with FC Ryazan.

Career
In March 2015, Kuleshov signed for FC Sakhalin Yuzhno-Sakhalinsk.

References

External links
 
 Profile at sportbox.ru  
 

1981 births
Sportspeople from Ryazan
Living people
Russian footballers
FC Mordovia Saransk players
Russian Premier League players
FC Torpedo Moscow players
FC Sakhalin Yuzhno-Sakhalinsk players
Association football midfielders